Edmund Quincy III (1681–1737) was an American merchant and judge. He was the son of Col. Edmund Quincy II (1627-1698) II and his second wife, Elizabeth Gookin. He married Dorothy Flynt and had 7 children.  Four lived to adulthood, including Edmund Quincy IV and Dorothy Quincy, who was the topic of a famous poem by Oliver Wendell Holmes, Sr.

Life

Like his father and grandfather, he was deeply involved with the affairs of the Massachusetts colony. He was a magistrate, Supreme Court judge from 1718 until his death, and a colonel in the Massachusetts militia. In 1737, he was appointed to a commission to settle the boundary between Massachusetts and New Hampshire. However, he contracted smallpox and died before his return to Massachusetts. The colony built a monument at his grave in Brunhill Fields Burial Ground in London and gave  in Lenox to his family as a tribute for all of his efforts.

See also
Quincy political family

References

1681 births
People of colonial Massachusetts
People from Quincy, Massachusetts
1737 deaths
Justices of the Massachusetts Superior Court of Judicature
Harvard University alumni